Itojo Hospital, is a hospital in Itojo, Ntungamo District, in Western Uganda.

Location
The geographical coordinates of Itojo Hospital are:
0°47'16.0"S, 30°16'38.0"E (Latitude:-0.787778; Longitude:30.277222).

Overview
Itojo hospital is a rural hospital built in the 1968 by the administration of Prime Minister Milton Obote. It serves Ntungamo District together with some parts of neighboring Northern Tanzania and Northeastern Rwanda. It has a bed capacity of 120, although sometimes many more patients are admitted, with many sleeping on the floor.

Over the years the hospital infrastructure has deteriorated. In 2006, the then area Member of Parliament, who is also the First Lady of Uganda, Janet Museveni, started to solicit funding from both internal and external sources, to rehabilitate the hospital.

In 2007, the Egyptian Government, through the Egyptian Fund for Technical Cooperation with Africa, donated US$280,000 to rehabilitate the hospital, including the construction of three new staff houses. Egypt also pledged to send three specialists; a surgeon, an obstetrician/gynecologist and a pediatrician, to work at the hospital as part of the assistance package.

The construction work was contracted out to Excel Construction Company Limited, a subsidiary of the Madhvani Group. In June 2011, Egypt donated pharmaceuticals, an electricity generator and other hospital supplies to assist in the rehabilitation of the hospital.

See also
Hospitals in Uganda

References

External links 
  Ntungamo District Information Portal
 Location of Itojo Hospital At Google Maps
 Egyptian Government Rehabilitates Itojo Hospital

Hospital buildings completed in 1968
Hospitals in Uganda
Ntungamo District
Ankole sub-region
Western Region, Uganda
1968 establishments in Uganda